The Polish Cup is a men's football competition in Poland.

Polish Cup may also refer to:
Polish Basketball Cup
Polish Cup (ice hockey)
Polish Cup (women's football)